Kladentsi is a village in Petrich Municipality, in Blagoevgrad Province, Bulgaria. Its coordinates are 23.05.41.4166666666667. As of 2013, it had a population of 36.

References

Villages in Blagoevgrad Province